Tregurnow is a settlement in St Buryan civil parish on the Penwith peninsula in Cornwall, England, United Kingdom.

At Tregurnow farm is an interesting Celtic cross from the medieval period similar to ones found on the Isle of Man.

External links

 Tregurnow stone circle from The Megalithic Portal website.

Villages in Cornwall
Penwith